Derbyshire County Cricket Club in 2003 was the cricket season when the English club Derbyshire had been playing for one hundred and thirty-six years. They reached the semi-final  in the Cheltenham and Gloucester Trophy. In the County Championship, they finished  ninth in the second division and in the National League, they finished sixth in the second division. They were eliminated at group level in the North section of the Twenty20 Cup.

2003 season

Derbyshire was in Division 2 of the County Championship and finished in sixth position. In addition to the Championship, they played Cambridge University. Of their seventeen first class games, they won two and lost eleven, the remainder being drawn. Derbyshire was in Division 2 of the NatWest Pro40 League in which they  won eight of their eighteen matches to finish sixth in the division. In the Cheltenham and Gloucester Trophy, Derbyshire reached the semi-finals. In the Twenty20 Cup, Derbyshire played in the North Division and won three matches. Dominic Cork was in his sixth season as captain.  Michael Di Venuto was top scorer and Graeme Welch took most wickets.

Matches

First Class

National League

Friends Provident Trophy

Twenty20 Cup

Statistics

Competition batting averages

Competition bowling averages

Wicket Keeping
Luke Sutton 
County Championship  Catches  25, Stumping 2 
PRO40 Catches 21, Stumping 1 
Friends Provident Catches 9, Stumping 0 
Twenty20 Catches 2, Stumping 2

See also
Derbyshire County Cricket Club seasons
2003 English cricket season

References

2003 in English cricket
Derbyshire County Cricket Club seasons